2010 Giravanz Kitakyushu season

Competitions

Player statistics

Other pages
 J. League official site

Giravanz Kitakyushu
Giravanz Kitakyushu seasons